Xylobiose is a disaccharide of xylose monomers with a beta-1,4-bond between them.

References

Disaccharides